The 2017–18 PSA World Tour is the international squash tour organised circuit organized by the Professional Squash Association (PSA) for the 2017 squash season. It's the 3rd PSA season since the merger of PSA and WSA associations in 2015.

The most important tournaments in the series are the Men's and Women's PSA World Championship. The tour also features three categories of regular events - PSA World Series, which feature the highest prize money and the best fields; PSA 25-100 (formerly International) and PSA 5-15 (formerly Challenger). In the middle of the year, the PSA World Series tour is concluded by the Men's and Women's PSA World Series Finals in Dubai, the World Series-ending championships for the top 8 rated players.  Players' performances in the tour are rated by World Rankings for men and women.

Calendar

Key

August

September

(*) – Seniors tournament.

October

November

December

January

February

March

‡: Not included in the PSA calendar.

April

May

‡: Not included in the PSA calendar. (Played in a round-robin format).

June

July

‡Although listed on PSA website as a both men's/women's tournament, women's draw was not played due to low number of registered players.

Statistical information

The players/nations are sorted by:
 Total number of titles;
 Cumulated importance of those titles;
 Alphabetical order (by family names for players).

Key

Titles won by player (men's)

Titles won by nation (men's)

Titles won by player (women's)

Titles won by nation (women's)

Retirements
Following is a list of notable players (winners of a main tour title, and/or part of the PSA Men's World Rankings and Women's World Rankings top 30 for at least one month) who announced their retirement from professional squash, became inactive, or were permanently banned from playing, during the 2017 season:

See also
2016–17 PSA World Series
2017–18 PSA World Series
2017 Men's PSA World Series Finals
2017 Women's PSA World Series Finals
2017 Men's World Squash Championship
2017 Women's World Squash Championship
2017 Men's World Team Squash Championships

References

External links
 PSA World Tour

PSA World Tour seasons
2017 in squash
2018 in squash